The 1988 Bordeaux Open also known as the Nabisco Grand Prix Passing Shot was a men's tennis tournament played on clay courts at Villa Primrose in Bordeaux, France that was part of the 1988 Nabisco Grand Prix circuit. It was the 11th edition of the tournament and was held from 25 July until 29 July 1988. Third-seeded Thomas Muster  won the singles title.

Finals

Singles

 Thomas Muster defeated  Ronald Agénor 6–3, 6–3
 It was Muster's 2nd singles title of the year and the 3rd of his career.

Doubles

 Joakim Nyström /  Claudio Panatta defeated  Christian Miniussi /  Diego Nargiso 6–1, 6–4

References

External links
 ITF tournament edition details

Bordeaux Open
ATP Bordeaux
Bordeaux Open
Bordeaux Open